Tagaküla is a village in Viimsi Parish, Harju County in Estonia.

References

Villages in Harju County